De Carolis is an Italian surname. Notable people with the surname include:

Adolfo de Carolis (1874–1928), Italian painter, xylographer, illustrator and photographer
Alex De Carolis (born 1992), Canadian soccer player
Bob De Carolis (born c. 1952), American athletic administrator and softball coach
Don Carolis Hewavitharana (1833-1906), Ceylonese businessman, industrialist, philanthropist and a pioneer of the Buddhist revival movement
Giovanni De Carolis (born 1984), Italian professional boxer
Giuseppe de Carolis (1652–1742), Italian Roman Catholic Bishop of Aquino e Pontecorvo
Natale de Carolis (born 1957), Italian opera singer
Patrick de Carolis (born 1953), French TV journalist and writer
Stelio De Carolis (1937–2017), Italian politician 
Ugo de Carolis (1887–1941), Italian military officer

See also
Caroli (surname)

Italian-language surnames